On 30 May 1990, three health officers, two from the Health Department of the Government of West Bengal and one from UNICEF were raped by a group of alleged CPI (M) supporters, in Bantala Road when they were returning from Gosaba Rangabelia. One of the officers and their driver died while resisting the attackers.

Incident 
On 30 May 1990, a team of three health officers were returning to Kolkata after inspecting an immunization program in Gosaba. The team consisted of Anita Dewan, the Deputy District Extension Media Officer of the West Bengal Health Department; Uma Ghosh, a senior officer of the Health Department; and Renu Ghosh, a representative of UNICEF's World Health Organization office in New Delhi. Around 6:30 pm when they had reached Bantala near the Eastern metropolitan bypass, a group of 4-5 youths stopped their car near the local club . The driver Abani Naia made an attempt to swerve and escape, but he lost control and the car overturned. In the meantime, another gang of 10-12 youths arrived at the spot, who pulled one of the ladies out of the car, while the others pulled out the other two ladies. The driver of the car tried to resist the youths, but failed. The attackers killed the driver and set the car on fire. The lady officers were then taken to a nearby paddy field and raped. One of the ladies, who tried to resist the rapists was killed.

The police brought the naked bodies of the officers to the emergency department of Calcutta National Medical College at around 11:30 pm. Initially they were presumed to be dead, but later two of them was found to be alive and were admitted for treatment. One lady doctor who examined the dead woman fainted when she discovered a metallic torch in the vagina of the officer.

The injured driver was transferred to SSKM Hospital for treatment. He bore 43 wounds in his body caused by blunt, sharp and heavy weapons. His penis was smashed by the attackers. On 4 June 1990 at 5:40 am, he died. The autopsy of his body was carried out by Dr. Biswanath Kahali, a Medical Officer on Training Reserve of the Health Department.

Investigation 
Prasanta Sur, the then Health Minister of West Bengal, defended the mob by contending that the victims might have been mistaken as child-abductors. But there is controversy regarding actual cause of the incident. The then Chief Minister Mr. Jyoti Basu made a casual remark regarding the incident "Such incidents do happen, don’t they…Mistakes do occur…..” which was strongly criticized by the media all over India. However, the government carried out investigation and finally, the six accused in the case served life-imprisonment.

References 

1990 crimes in India
Crime in West Bengal
South 24 Parganas district
1990s in West Bengal
Rape in India
Incidents of violence against women
Sex crimes in India
11. 
http://mainstreamweekly.net/article10675.html